The White House Office of Faith-Based and Neighborhood Partnerships, formerly the White House Office of Faith-Based and Community Initiatives (OFBCI) is an office within the White House Office that is part of the Executive Office of the President of the United States.

Under George W. Bush
OFBCI was established by President George W. Bush through an executive order on January 29, 2001, representing one of the key domestic policies of Bush's campaign promise of "compassionate conservatism." The initiative sought to strengthen faith-based and community organizations and expand their capacity to provide federally funded social services, positing that these groups were well-situated to meet the needs of local individuals. As Texas governor, Bush had used the "Charitable Choice" provisions of the 1996 welfare reform (which allowed "faith-based" entities to compete for government contracts to deliver social services) to support the work of faith-based groups in Texas. Established religions offer a critical financial contribution to the overall effort and effect of social services (e.g., community services with health care financing) in the US.

The office was briefly led by Don Willett, an aide from Bush's tenure as governor of Texas who was later appointed a justice of the Supreme Court of Texas. The first person named as director of the OFBCI was John DiIulio, a University of Pennsylvania political science professor. DiIulio later left the office and became a critic of the Bush administration.

Critics of the OFBCI, including Americans United for Separation of Church and State and the American Civil Liberties Union, assert that it violated the Establishment Clause by using tax money to fund religion. They also argued that faith-based initiatives were used as part of electoral strategies to yield more votes for Bush and the GOP.

For fiscal year 2005, more than $2.2 billion in competitive social service grants were awarded to faith-based organizations. Between fiscal years 2003 and 2005, the total dollar amount of all grants awarded to FBOs increased by 21 percent (GAO 2006:43). The majority of these grants were distributed through state agencies to local organizations in the form of formula grants (GAO 2006:17).

Establishment clause issues
Faith-based organizations are eligible to participate in federally administered social service programs to the same degree as any other group, although certain restrictions on FBOs that accept government funding have been created by the White House to avoid violations of the Establishment Clause.
They may not use direct government funds to support inherently religious activities such as prayer, worship, religious instruction, or proselytization.
Any inherently religious activities that the organizations may offer must be offered separately in time or location from services that receive federal assistance.
FBOs cannot discriminate on the basis of religion when providing services (GAO 2006:13).

Under Barack Obama

President Barack Obama renamed the office and appointed Joshua DuBois as its head. He also established an advisory council, composed of religious and secular leaders and scholars from different backgrounds. Each member of the council was appointed to a one-year term. 

According to ABC News, the office would seek "to expand the role of this office as it relates to policy issues where religious and local leaders can be effective. DuBois would coordinate with faith-based and community organizations on social service outreach and work to utilize these organizations' efforts to advance the administration's policies, with a primary focus on poverty." Joshua DuBois resigned as director in February 2013 and was succeeded by Melissa Rogers in March.

Under Donald Trump
Following the election of President Donald Trump, the office remained without a director; the website was no longer available. In May 2018, Trump started the Faith and Opportunity Initiative, a new White House office to help faith-based organizations get equal access to government funding.

Under Joe Biden
On February 14, 2021, President Joe Biden reestablished the Office with Melissa Rogers again serving as executive director.

Controversies
The separation of church and state was noted as one of major issues with the Faith-Based Initiatives laws.  Critics have claimed that millions in government grants have gone to ministries operated by political supporters of the Bush administration, or have been given to minority pastors who recently committed their support.
In June 2006, U.S. District Judge Robert W. Pratt ruled that a faith based-program called InnerChange at a Newton, Iowa prison, operated by Charles Colson's Prison Fellowship Ministries, unconstitutionally used tax money for a religious program that gave special privileges to inmates who accepted its evangelical Christian teachings and terms. "For all practical purposes," Judge Pratt said, "the state has literally established an Evangelical Christian congregation within the walls of one of its penal institutions, giving the leaders of that congregation, i.e., InnerChange employees, authority to control the spiritual, emotional, and physical lives of hundreds of Iowa inmates." [See Americans United v. Prison Fellowship Ministries, 2006 U.S. Dist. LEXIS 36970, June 2, 2006]
On June 25, 2007, the U.S. Supreme Court ruled 5–4 in Hein v. Freedom From Religion Foundation that executive orders may not be challenged on Establishment Clause grounds by individuals whose sole claim to legal standing is that they are taxpayers.  Both of President Bush's court appointees, John G. Roberts and Samuel Alito, sided with the majority.
The second head of the department, Jim Towey, in a session of "Ask the Whitehouse" dated November 26, 2003, stated in regard to a question about pagan faith-based organizations:

I haven't run into a pagan faith-based group yet, much less a pagan group that cares for the poor! Once you make it clear to any applicant that public money must go to public purposes and can't be used to promote ideology, the fringe groups lose interest. Helping the poor is tough work and only those with loving hearts seem drawn to it. 

Pagans reacted angrily to the label "fringe group", the suggestion that pagans are uncompassionate, the idea that they would apply for funding only to promote ideology, and the exclusion of pagan organizations implicit in the statement.
Catholic League President William A. Donohue protested against the nomination of Harry Knox, a former director of Human Rights Campaign and gay rights activist, arguing that he has been dishonest and intolerant. Knox has condemned the positions of Catholic clergy on the issues of contraception and ordination of homosexuals.

References

Books

External links
Office of Faith-Based and Neighborhood Partnerships
"Obama's Faith-Based Office" (video | audio), Speaking of Faith with Krista Tippett (May 21, 2009) - a public radio interview with Joshua DuBois
How Obama's Faith Council Worked: Six Points of Consensus, Jim Wallis, God's Politics blog, March 11, 2010.
Archive White House FBCI Office - Archived site from the George W. Bush Administration
National Association of Faith Based Initiatives (Commercial site, not affiliated with Federal Gov't)
Book says Bush just using Christians, MSNBC, October 11, 2006
 Boston Globe series about USAID and "Faith-based initiatives": *Part 1 *2 *3
Obama's Faith-Based Follies, Faith Complex, On Faith, Washington Post, June 22, 2009 - Jacques Berlinerblau interviews Washington Post's Jacqui Salmon about the Office of Faith-Based and Neighborhood Partnerships
Mind the Leadership Gap, by Dr. Robert Aziz, Huffington Post, April 13, 2009.

2001 establishments in the United States
Executive Office of the President of the United States
Faith-Based and Neighborhood Partnerships
Presidency of George W. Bush
Presidency of Barack Obama